The pair skating competition of the 2014 Winter Olympics was held at the Iceberg Skating Palace in Sochi, Russia.

The short program was held on 11 February, and the free skating on 12 February.

Records
For complete list of figure skating records, see list of highest scores in figure skating.

Prior to the competition, the existing ISU best scores were:

The following new best score was set during this competition:

Schedule
All dates and times are (UTC+4).

Results

Short program

The short program was held on 11 February.

Free skating
The Free skate was held on 12 February.

Overall
Pairs were listed according to their overall score.

References

External links
 Sochi 2014 Figure Skating – Pairs skating page 
 Sochi 2014 Figure Skating Results Book
 2014 Winter Olympics page at the International Skating Union
 

Ladies
2014
Mixed events at the 2014 Winter Olympics
2014 in figure skating